Arts University Bournemouth (abbreviated AUB) is a further and higher education university based in Poole, England, specialising in art, performance, design, and media. It was formerly known as The Arts University College at Bournemouth and The Arts Institute at Bournemouth and is the home of Bournemouth Film School.

AUB is the second-largest university in Bournemouth and Poole, Bournemouth University being much larger and AECC University College being smaller.

The university was awarded Gold in the 2017 Teaching Excellence Framework, a government assessment of the quality of undergraduate teaching in universities and other higher education providers in England. This award noted high levels of professional employment among graduates.

History

The first art school in Bournemouth was the Bournemouth Government School of Art, established in 1880. There was a considerable demand in Bournemouth at that time for instruction in Art and the numbers in the art school soon rose to 180. In 1884, the school became a Science and Art school. In 1885, the Bournemouth School of Science and Art moved to 1 Regent's Terrace, in Old Christchurch Road, where it remained until 1890.

When the Bournemouth School of Science and Art was forced to close due to a decrease in numbers and loss of grant in 1890–91, the majority of its students were transferred to the Bournemouth West School of Science and Art.

In 1913, the two Science and Art Schools at Bournemouth East and Bournemouth West were incorporated into the Bournemouth and Poole College of Art and Design along with the Technical and Commercial Schools. All art subjects then came under the umbrella of the School of Art within the Bournemouth Municipal College.

In 1964, Bournemouth and Poole College of Art was formed through the merger of Bournemouth Municipal College of Art and Poole College of Art. The name was changed to Bournemouth and Poole College of Art and Design in 1979. The first new building on the present campus was opened in 1984 and built at a cost of £2.3 million.

In 1998, the name was changed to The Arts Institute at Bournemouth (AIB) and won a Queen's Anniversary Prize for "Education in the film industry". In 2001, the AIB became a higher education institution. 

In 2009, the Arts Institute Bournemouth changed its name to the Arts University College at Bournemouth following the acquisition of taught degree awarding powers in 2008.

In June 2012, the Government announced that the qualifying threshold required by an institution in order to gain full university status was to be lowered from 4,000 to 1,000 full-time higher education students. The Arts University College at Bournemouth satisfied this criterion for full university title and officially became Arts University Bournemouth (AUB) following approval from the Privy Council on 13 December 2012.

Bournemouth Film School

Bournemouth Film School was established in 1963 as part of a Cine pathway within the Bournemouth and Poole College of Art and Design by Reginald Johnson. The Bournemouth Film School is a registered trademark  owned by the Arts University Bournemouth. In 2016, Bournemouth Film School (BFS) celebrated over 50 years of excellence. Arts University Bournemouth is a full member of CILECT.

BFS is made up of:
BA (Hons) Acting
BA (Hons) Animation Production
BA (Hons) Costume
BA (Hons) Creative Writing
BA (Hons) Dance
BA (Hons) Events Management
BA (Hons) Film Production
BA (Hons) Make-Up for Media and Performance
BA (Hons) Performance Design and Film Costume
BA (Hons) Visual Effects (VFX) for Film and Television

Campus

Most courses are based within one campus which is located in Poole, next to Bournemouth University and Wallisdown. The Campus covers around 3.7 hectares and houses 19 buildings with specialist workshops and workspaces, many of which are shared across similar courses.
The BA (Hons) Dance course is partly based at Pavilion dance South West.

Notable facilities include:
 The Library – Over 50,000 books available covering a range of art, design, media, and performance subjects.
 The Refectory – Was a semi-finalist in the Bournemouth and Poole Tourism Awards 2018 "Breakfast of the Year" category
 TheGallery – A gallery open to the public displaying both international touring exhibitions, and work from alumni, staff, and students.
 MoDiP (Museum of Design in Plastics) – The only accredited museum in the UK with a focus on plastics, MoDiP is located inside the AUB library. , the collection catalog listed over 10,000 objects.
 North Building Extension – A building mainly for photography courses offering flexible teaching spaces, IT suites, and a lecture theatre, which was shortlisted for the 2016 RIBA South West Awards. It was designed by Design Engine Architects Ltd.
 The CRAB Drawing Studio, an innovative building designed by the Cook-Robotham Architectural Bureau led by Sir Peter Cook, which was shortlisted for the 2016 RIBA South West Awards. It is the first purpose-built drawing studio to open in the UK for 100 years, emphasising natural light and featuring a large circular north-light and a rear clerestory, which provides softer light.
 The Student Services Building, which also houses the Students’ Union, and facilities management. This building was also shortlisted for the 2016 RIBA South West Awards.

Sustainability and environment
The university ranked 88 out of 154 in the 2019 The People & Planet Green League table with a total score of 33%.

The Students’ Union at Arts University Bournemouth and AUB have formed a partnership with the Woodland Trust which will see a tree planted for each new student at AUB.

In 2016 Arts University Bournemouth announced its commitment to never invest in fossil fuels.

In 2019, the university was awarded EcoCampus Platinum.

Organisation and governance
AUB is governed by its board of governors. The principal and vice-chancellor, through the University Management Team, is responsible for the executive management of the university, supported by a number of executive committees. The academic board is the university's principal academic authority. Subject to the responsibilities of the board of governors and the principal and vice-chancellor, the academic board has oversight of academic activities. In 2020, Paul Gough was appointed principal and vice chancellor of the university, following the retirement of Stuart Bartholomew, who had served as principal and vice chancellor at the institution since 1997.

Arts University Bournemouth is currently divided into the following faculties:
 Faculty of Media & Performance
 Faculty of Art, Design & Architecture

The university also validates courses in various art-related subjects for Bournemouth and Poole College and The Northern School of Art.

Arts University Bournemouth is a member of GuildHE, one of the two recognised representative bodies for Higher Education in the UK.

Academics

The university offers short courses, Summer courses as well as Foundation Diplomas, BA, MA and Research (MPhil/PhD) degrees. The main focus of all courses lies within the areas of art, design, media, and performance.

The institution runs 23 undergraduate and 10 postgraduate programmes organised in two faculties: the Faculty of Art and Design and the Faculty of Media and Performance. These courses are validated for a maximum period of five years and, during the final year, a periodic review is undertaken by a process similar to that for validation with the addition to the panel of up to two student representatives.

AUB was awarded Gold ("provision is consistently outstanding and of the highest quality found in the UK Higher Education sector") in the 2017 Teaching Excellence Framework, a government assessment of the quality of undergraduate teaching in universities and other higher education providers in England. Further Education teaching at AUB was also rated Outstanding (with Outstanding ratings in all criteria) by Ofsted in 2018.

Rankings

AUB was named No.1 Creative University in the Which? University 2012 survey. The university was not ranked in 2014 due to the lack of students taking part in the survey but was listed in the top 5 in 2018.

In 2016 Arts University Bournemouth was the first university or college of art to receive The Sir Misha Black Award, created in 1999 to honour the exceptional work of a teacher, team, department, or course within or between educational establishments in the UK.

AUB has twice won a Queen's Anniversary Prize for Higher and Further Education. In 1999 Arts University Bournemouth (the Arts Institute at Bournemouth) won the Arts prize for "Education for the film industry." and in 2017 it was announced that the costume design course had won the prize.

Student life

Students’ Union
All students of the Arts University Bournemouth are automatically a member of the Arts University Bournemouth Students’ Union (AUBSU), a registered charity affiliated with the National Union of Students. AUBSU runs over 30 clubs and societies, organises Freshers’ Weeks, volunteering and fundraising events, trains course representatives, and hosts annual general meetings for all students. Each year, elections are held for both sabbatical (President, vice-president) and all volunteer (e.g. Events Officer, Communications Officer and Equality and Diversity Officer) posts.

AUBSU publishes a free, student led magazine called BUMF. It is published termly and includes content from university course programmes, music, poetry, and writing.

Student housing
The university maintains four off-campus student halls throughout the town. Places are allocated with a priority to students living further away from Bournemouth and to students with disabilities/medical conditions. The university hosts two accommodation days before the beginning of each academic year, so prospective students can independently form house-sharing groups and view private rented accommodation.

The three main halls of residence are:
 Madeira Road – Built in 2014 with 378 beds, located in the town centre of Bournemouth
Home Park – Located in the Lansdowne area of Bournemouth, the Home Park offers ensuite rooms and studios to first year students.
Campus Halls – Three on-campus block are being built to house 300 students.

In their second and third years, many students live in nearby suburbs of Bournemouth: typically Winton, Charminster or Boscombe, where they can live in independently owned residences.

Notable alumni

 Simon Beaufoy, screenwriter of Slumdog Millionnaire, 127 Hours and The Full Monty (Bournemouth Film School)
 Nick Berkeley photographer and filmmaker, Arts Council Fine Arts award winner
 Paul Campion, visual effects on Clash of the Titans and X-Men: The Last Stand
 Joe Cornish, writer/director of Attack the Block, and writer of The Adventures of Tintin: The Secret of the Unicorn
 Chris Dickens, editor of Slumdog Millionaire, Paul and Submarine
 Bille Eltringham, director of This Is Not a Love Song and Ashes to Ashes (Bournemouth Film School)
 Jonathan English, producer of Shoot 'Em Up, writer/director of Ironclad, and director of Minotaur
 Oliver Irving, writer/director of How to Be (Bournemouth Film School)
 Chris Jones, director of White Angel and Gone Fishing, and writer of The Guerilla Filmmakers Handbook
 Yvonne Grundy, Actress, the voice of Nia in Thomas & Friends
 Nick Knight, fashion photographer (Photography, Bournemouth & Poole College of Art and Design, 1982)
 Suri Krishnamma, director of A Man of No Importance (Arts Institute at Bournemouth)
 Nick Love, writer/director/producer of The Football Factory, Outlaw and The Business
 Duncan Roy, director of AKA and Method (Film, Bournemouth and Poole College)
 Sam Smith, toy-maker
 Sara Sugarman, director of Confessions of a Teenage Drama Queen and Waking the Dead (Film & Television, Bournemouth Film School)
 Katrina Tang, photographer and videographer, Nominated by PDN as 30 most notable photographers to watch in 2015
 Wolfgang Tillmans, photographer, Turner Prize winner (Bournemouth and Poole College of Art and Design, 1990–92)
 Tony Weare, comics artist best known for the Matt Marriott western strip in The Evening News and Illustration for V for Vendetta (Bournemouth School of Art)
 Edgar Wright, director of Scott Pilgrim vs. the World, Shaun of the Dead, and Hot Fuzz (Audio-Visual Design, Bournemouth and Poole College of Art, 1992–94)

Honorary Fellows
Jenny Beavan
Darcey Bussell
Margaret Calvert
Peter Cook (architect)
Mike Davies (architect)
Roger Dean (artist)
Nick Dudman
Caryn Franklin
Darren Henley
Suri Krishnamma
Peter Lord
Martin Roth (museum director)
Dougie Scarfe
Helen Storey
Wolfgang Tillmans
Dame Vivienne Westwood
Edgar Wright

See also

 Armorial of UK universities
 List of art universities and colleges in Europe
 List of universities in the UK
 Visual arts education

Notes

References

External links

 Arts University Bournemouth website

 
Bournemouth
Education in Poole
Educational institutions established in 1885
1885 establishments in England
Bournemouth
Animation schools in the United Kingdom